The women's points race at the 2006 Commonwealth Games took place on March 17, 2006 at the Vodafone Arena.

Results

External links
 Results

Track cycling at the 2006 Commonwealth Games
Cycling at the Commonwealth Games – Women's points race
Comm